KTSF (channel 26) is a multicultural independent television station licensed to San Francisco, California, United States, serving the San Francisco Bay Area. The station is owned by the Lincoln Broadcasting Company, and maintains studios on Valley Drive in south suburban Brisbane. Through a channel sharing agreement with Univision owned-and-operated station KDTV-DT (channel 14), the two stations transmit using KDTV-DT's spectrum from an antenna atop Mount Allison. Until May 7, 2018, KTSF's transmitter was located atop San Bruno Mountain.

History

In 1965, Lillian Lincoln Howell was issued a broadcast license for a new television station in San Francisco. Her goal was to offer programming to audiences that were not targeted by the television stations already on the air at the time, with her stated mission being to "serve the underserved". It took several years to build the station, but when KTSF finally went on air on September 4, 1976, it began broadcasting a general entertainment format featuring older off-network shows from 1950 to 1965, anime, live-action shows dubbed in English, older movies during the day, and Asian programming after 7:00 p.m. weekdays and 4:00 p.m. weekends. For many years, a half-hour horse racing program hosted by Sam Speer brought a video of the Golden Gate Fields or Bay Meadows daily results, which ran until December 2017. The station also ran religious programs in the morning hours such as The PTL Club and Praise the Lord. Entertainment shows included Dennis the Menace, The Donna Reed Show, Hazel, The Flying Nun, Father Knows Best, Lassie, Marine Boy, Ultraman, King Kong cartoons and The Space Giants. At that time, four other independent Bay Area stations had general entertainment schedules, including KTVU, KTZO (now KOFY-TV), KICU, and KBHK (now KBCW). By 1981, the Japanese animated and live-action shows were dropped, as well as the station's -TV suffix on New Year's Day. Jay Peterson was one of the main announcers with studios located in the China Basin Building. KTSF was also the first U.S. broadcaster to carry Asian-language programming.

KTSF discontinued Chinese and other Asian programming during weeknights on August 17, 1980, relegating it to weekend afternoons. Daily after 7:00 p.m., the station picked up a subscription TV service called Super-Time, later STAR TV, operated by Subscription Television of San Francisco. Two films were offered that first night: The First Great Train Robbery (1978) and Cuba (1979). Its signal would appear scrambled, with an audio message being played that described the service and provided a phone number to subscribe. Descrambler boxes could be rented to view the channel. In 1983, Satellite Television & Associated Resources, the parent company of Subscription Television of San Francisco and part-owner of a similar service in Boston, filed for Chapter 7 bankruptcy and was liquidated. STAR TV was replaced by another service, Select TV, but in late 1984, Vision Enterprises, the operator, declared bankruptcy, and a federal judge allowed KTSF to stop carrying their programming over $250,000 in unpaid fees to the station.

In 1983, KTSF expanded its Asian content to reflect the changing demographics of the Bay Area. With increasing immigration of the Bay Area's Asian population from the Philippines and Korea, KTSF began producing Tagalog and Korean content and expanded its schedule to include programming from India and Iran. The station began running this programming daily in the afternoon. With Select TV having collapsed, KTSF expanded its Asian offerings to evenings and overnights as well. In 1985, KTSF dropped general English entertainment programming, partly due to the fact that San Francisco had four other stations employing that format.

A significant step in the station's history came in 1987 when it hired Gallup to perform the first Chinese-language consumer study ever conducted in the United States. The Gallup study demonstrated to mainstream U.S. companies that the Chinese-American market behaved like most other groups. For instance, the vast majority of Chinese people had bank accounts at mainstream financial institutions such as Bank of America and Wells Fargo, while only a small percentage had accounts at Chinese-owned banks. The major grocery store chains, with their large variety of products and convenient locations, were patronized by 75% of Chinese-Americans on a weekly basis. With this new research, KTSF was able to attract mainstream U.S. companies to the Asian-American market.

KTSF was nominated for and won its only Emmy Award in 1987 when animator Brian Clark redesigned the station's on-air identity package.

On February 6, 1989, KTSF launched the first live Chinese-language newscast in the United States. Throughout the 1990s, with the H-1B visas in place, it was easier for U.S. companies to attract qualified workers from other countries. The Bay Area saw a large number of workers from China, Taiwan and India move to Silicon Valley. KTSF responded by expanding its Mandarin-language and South Asian programming.

In 2005, KTSF became the first Asian broadcaster in the U.S. to subscribe to Nielsen. With the daily overnight viewing data, KTSF was able to help advertisers better target the Asian demographic. By 2010, KTSF carried programming in twelve languages including Mandarin, Cantonese, Taiwanese, Japanese, Korean, Vietnamese, Hindi and Tagalog.

In 2007, the KTSF news department expanded by adding a special features unit. A series of in-depth news features and hour-long documentaries were scheduled throughout the year. Topics included the tenth anniversary of the Hong Kong handover, the fashion industry in China, Olympic previews and the 40th anniversary of the Cultural Revolution.

In 2008, a weekly business show, Business and Lifestyle, began airing. The show featured successful business profiles from the industries of finance, real estate, beauty, health, and nutrition. It also included tips from established entrepreneurs on how to grow your business and how to avoid the common pitfalls of first-time business owners. 
 
In 2010, Kaitlyn's Beauty Journal began airing. The show was produced and broadcast in Mandarin Chinese with English subtitles and hosted by popular beauty blogger Kuan-Ling Kaitlyn Chen, features make-up application tips, hair and nail care how-to's, product reviews and tests, and the latest fashion trends. Kaitlyn's Beauty Journal broadcasts in New York, Los Angeles, Seattle, and Houston. Kaitlyn's Beauty Journal has the potential to reach 56.3% of all Chinese in the U.S.

In 2012, KTSF was launched on Syncbak App, for a national distribution deal.

In 2014, KTSF launched its local TV app in the Apple App Store and Google Play Store and fully implemented Nielsen proprietary mobile measurement software in order to inform its research and insights and drive advertising effectiveness, which leaves the Syncbak App.

On February 1, 2016, KTSF's main signal was upgraded from 4:3 standard definition (480i) to 16:9 high definition (720p), which allowed local programming and the Cantonese and Mandarin newscasts to be broadcast in widescreen.

On May 7, 2018, KTSF's transmission moved from San Bruno Mountain to Mount Allison, sharing it with Univision owned-and-operated station KDTV-DT (channel 14).

On April 29, 2020, at 1 p.m., KTSF moved its signal to UHF channel 20. After the rescan, KTSF remains on 26.1.

On February 1, 2021, KTSF Local TV App was discontinued and moved to a free, live, local TV streaming service, called VUit.

Programming
From February 13, 2006, to December 27, 2019, KTSF aired Talk Tonight, a live Mandarin-language phone-in talk show; guests have included a variety of entertainment, political and sports figures. On August 4, 2013, the station began producing a local Mandarin-language financial program titled Talk Finance.

Mandarin programming

In addition to homemade news, KTSF broadcasts news programs from overseas TV stations during weekdays, including China Central Television's China News at 11:00 AM (Formerly 8:00 originally, then 8:30 in some shifts, then 7:00 as a filler program), Taiwan's EBC News at noon (formerly ZhongTian News until the expired licence), and the Philippines' TV Patrol from ABS-CBN. In the past, the News Report of Hong Kong Asia Television was broadcast before being canceled. Ching Kong Fa Shi's "A Path to True Happiness" airs live at 1:30 PM daily and rebroadcasts at 1:30 A.M (Formerly 1:00 AM). Da-Ai Dramas are also aired after EBC News.

Japanese programming
KTSF broadcast Japanese programming during primetime on Saturday and Sunday, along with a Japanese-language morning news program on weekdays, titled FCI Morning Eye. Fuji TV provided the Saturday-night programming, while Tokyo TV provided its Sunday-night programming, branded as TTV. Fuji TV had been broadcasting since February 20, 1972 (predating KTSF's actual debut), while Tokyo Television programming debuted on KTSF when it launched on September 4, 1976. By December 2011, TTV programming had moved to KCNS channel 38.4.

Fuji TV telecasts on KTSF ceased on March 29, 2014. KTSF has not aired any Japanese-language programming since.

CMC on KTSF
On weekday afternoons, KTSF carried programming from the California Music Channel: CMC California Music Channel and CMC Beat Lounge. The station also aired a late-night version of CMC that broadcast on Saturday nights, known as CMC Late Night. After 34 years the station dropped CMC on February 23, 2018.

South Asian programming 
On Saturdays from 9 a.m. to noon, KTSF broadcasts Namaste America (since January 1, 2000), Showbiz India (since January 8, 2000), and India Waves Network (since December 28, 2019; then shortened to half-hour on December 3, 2022). On Sundays, KTSF broadcasts Persian variety show Nima TV (since 1989) at noon.

News operation
KTSF presently broadcasts 34 hours of locally produced newscasts each week (with 6½ hours each weekday, 1½ hours on Saturdays and an hour on Sundays). The station's newscasts are subject to delay or preemption due to special programming. It is currently the only television station in the United States broadcasting daily live local and international news programming in both Cantonese and Mandarin. KTSF currently utilizes Traditional Chinese subtitles for both languages; open captions are employed since closed captioning is only available for languages based on the Latin alphabet (e.g. English and Spanish).

The station launched its news department on February 6, 1989, with the debut of Cantonese News and Mandarin News as the first live Chinese-language television programs in the United States. The station launched Mandarin News and a local Mandarin-language talk program currently named Talk Tonight. Chinese News at 9 originally aired at 9:00 p.m. for 30 minutes but was renamed Cantonese News on September 27, 1993, before it was extended to one hour, moved back to 8:00 p.m., and eventually the current 7:00 p.m. timeslot on December 17, 2001. Chinese News at 8:45 originally aired at 8:45 p.m. for 15 minutes but was renamed Mandarin News on February 7, 1994, before it was extended to 30 minutes and moved back to the 7:30 p.m. timeslot. It was extended to one hour and currently airs at 10:00 p.m. since December 17, 2001. As of March 16, 2020, another half hour of Cantonese News broadcasts at 8:30 p.m. on weekdays after News Talk Time at 8:00 on weekdays. Talk Finance with Sau-Wing Lam airs Fridays from 8:00 to 9:00 in Cantonese. On January 4, 2021, this show returned with its new time, Mondays from 8:00 p.m. to 9:00 p.m. News Talk Time and Chinese News at 8:30 now also air on Fridays, that debuted on March 27, 2020.

The station aired Hong Kong Weekly News from February 11, 1989, to March 18, 2006, with minor schedule changes. The program was moved to 5:30 p.m. on December 28, 2002, before being moved back to the 5:00 p.m. timeslot on March 6, 2004. It airs now on Saturdays at 5:30 p.m. The station began producing weekend editions of its newscasts in Cantonese and Mandarin on March 25, 2006, that originally aired only in Cantonese on Saturday and Mandarin on Sunday. They originally aired at 6:00 p.m. on both days before moving to 7:00 p.m. on January 4, 2014. Another major change occurred on January 9, 2016, as both the Cantonese and Mandarin newscasts expanded to air on both Saturday and Sunday at 7:00 and 10:00 p.m. respectively to match their weekday counterparts. Unlike the weekday newscasts, the weekend news in both Cantonese and Mandarin air for 30 minutes as opposed to one hour on weekdays.

The first local morning news in Cantonese debuted on October 17, 2016, Monday to Friday from 6:00 to 8:00 a.m., with frequent weather and traffic updates every 10 minutes, called KTSF Morning News. Unlike a typical Chinese morning newscast, which runs their traffic and weather updates every 30 minutes, KTSF runs their morning newscast as a conventional morning newscast and adapts news in a similar format to most morning newscasts in the United States, retaining features that are common on evening newscasts broadcast in Cantonese. Formerly for two months, KTSF aired Mandarin Morning News weekdays from 7:30-8:00 a.m. Since May 15, 2020, KTSF airs reruns of newscasts and other Chinese programs daily. On July 20, 2021, at 7:00 p.m., KTSF extended 30 minutes more for Chinese News at 7 replacing Chinese News at 8. In addition to Chinese News at 7 for the extended time, KTSF continues for Chinese News at 8:30. This is the first live broadcast in the U.S., and the number of viewers will be the same.

Technical information

Subchannels
The station's digital signal is multiplexed:

KTSF formerly carried NHK World on digital channel 26.2; the network moved to KCNS digital subchannel 38.4 on November 1, 2011. KTSF also formerly carried KBS World on digital channel 26.3 until KBS and KTSF discontinued their relationship on January 1, 2015. ICN on subchannel 26.4, a Chinese TV network also formerly available in New York and Los Angeles, ceased operations in mid-2016. The Indian American network, Diya TV, ceased at midnight on May 7, 2018, due to KTSF moving to a new antenna and Diya's acquisition of KAAP-LD Channel 24 in the South Bay.

Analog-to-digital conversion
KTSF's digital signal launched in 2002 on UHF channel 27. The station shut down its analog signal, over UHF channel 26, on June 12, 2009, as part of the federally mandated transition from analog to digital television. The station's digital signal remained on its pre-transition UHF channel 27, using PSIP to display KTSF's virtual channel as 26 on digital television receivers. On May 7, 2018, the DTV transmitter for KTSF was turned off, and KTSF programming was shifted to virtual channels broadcast by KDTV from Mt. Allison.

References

External links
KTSF Homepage: English Version
KTSF Homepage: Chinese Version
KTSF Facebook page

Independent television stations in the United States
Television channels and stations established in 1976
1976 establishments in California
TSF
TSF
Japanese-language television stations
TSF